Haugland may refer to:

People

Places
 Haugland, Agder, a village in Kvinesdal municipality, Norway
 Haugland, Alver, a village in Radøy municipality, Norway
 Haugland, Askøy, a village in Askøy municipality, Norway
 Haugland, Drangedal, a village in Drangedal municipality, Norway
 Haugland, Lurøy, a village in Lurøy municipality, Norway

See also
 Hogland